Copper ditelluride is an inorganic compound with the chemical formula CuTe2. It is a superconductor with a C18 structure and a transition temperature of 1.3 K. CuTe2 crystals can be synthesized by reacting elemental copper and tellurium with a molar ratio of 1:2 at a pressure of 65 kbar for 1–3 hours at 1000–1200 °C, followed by slow cooling.

References

Copper(II) compounds
Tellurides
Transition metal dichalcogenides